The following is a timeline of important events in the history of private spaceflight, including important technical as well as legislative and political advances. Though the industry has its origins in the early 1960s, soon after the beginning of the Space Age, private companies did not begin conducting launches into space until the 1980s, and it was not until the 21st century that multiple companies began privately developing and operating launch vehicles and spacecraft in earnest.

Before 1980

 30 September 1929 – Opel-RAK, the world's first large-scale experimental rocket program under the leadership of Fritz von Opel and Max Valier demonstrates the world's first public manned flight of a rocket-plane with von Opel as pilot.
 12 December 1961 – OSCAR 1, the first amateur built satellite, is launched aboard an American Thor-Agena rocket.
10 July 1962 – Telstar 1, the first satellite to be used commercially, is launched on the first commercially sponsored space launch, aboard a Thor-Delta rocket.
 31 August 1962 – President John F. Kennedy signs the Communications Satellite Act of 1962 providing the regulatory framework for private companies in the United States to own and operate their own satellites.
 6 April 1965 - Intelsat Intelsat 1 known as "Early Bird" was the first commercial communications satellite to be placed in geosynchronous orbit. 
 9 November 1972 - Canadian Telesat Anik A1 launched world's first domestic communications satellite in geostationary orbit operated by a commercial company.
 13 April 1974 - Western Union Westar 1 becomes  America's first domestic and commercially launched geostationary communications satellite.
1975 – OTRAG, the first company to attempt private development and manufacture of space propulsion systems, is founded in Stuttgart, Germany, though its program is ultimately abandoned in the early 1980s.

1980s

9 September 1982 – Conestoga I, a repurposed Minuteman second stage, is launched from Matagorda Island to an altitude of 309 km (192 miles) by Space Services Inc., becoming the first privately owned and operated rocket to reach space.
10 September 1982 or 16 June 1983 – Europe's Arianespace becomes the world's first commercial launch service provider.
30 October 1984 – President Ronald Reagan signs the Commercial Space Launch Act of 1984, which mandates NASA to encourage private spaceflight, and authorizes the Office of Commercial Space Transportation to regulate private spaceflight in the United States.
 	15 June 1988 - PanAmSat PAS-1 becomes the first privately owned international telecommunications satellite. 
29 March 1989 – Starfire, a repurposed Black Brant sounding rocket launched by Space Services Inc., is the first rocket to launch with a commercial launch license from the Office of Commercial Space Transportation.

1990s

5 April 1990 – Pegasus, an air launched rocket developed by Orbital Sciences Corporation becomes the first launch vehicle fully developed by a private company to reach space, as well as the first air launched rocket of any kind to reach orbit
16 November 1992 – Space Flight Europe-America 500, an orbital mission consisting of a space capsule bearing gifts from Russia to the United States, is launched by the Russian company TsSKB-Progress aboard a Soyuz rocket, before landing six days later off the coast of Grays Harbor in the United States.
November 1995 – The Office of Commercial Space Transportation is transferred to the Federal Aviation Administration (FAA), becoming the FAA Associate Administrator for Space Transportation, or FAA/AST.
May 1996 – Creation of the Ansari X-Prize.
24 December 1997 - DigitalGlobe EarlyBird-1 becomes the first commercial Earth imaging satellite.
13 May 1998– HGS-1, a communications satellite operated at the time by Hughes Global Services Inc., becomes the first commercial spacecraft to visit the Moon, after flying to within 6,200 km of the lunar surface on a free return trajectory in order to salvage it from an unusable orbit.

2000s

4 April 2000 – Soyuz TM-30, a crewed mission to the space station Mir arranged by the company MirCorp in collaboration with the Russian Federal Space Agency, launches, becoming the first privately funded space station expedition.
28 April 2001 – Dennis Tito becomes the first space tourist, launching to the International Space Station aboard a Russian Soyuz spacecraft after paying for a seat arranged by the American company Space Adventures.
17 May 2004 – The Civilian Space eXploration Team (CSXT) becomes the first amateur organization to send a rocket into space, with the launch of their “GoFast” rocket to 116 km (72 miles) altitude.
21 June 2004 – Scaled Composites’ SpaceShipOne conducts the first privately flown and funded crewed spaceflight, piloted by Mike Melvill.
23 December 2004 – President George W. Bush signs the Commercial Space Launch Amendments Act of 2004, which provides a basic legal framework for commercial human spaceflight. It also creates the so-called “learning period,” a temporary restriction on the FAA's ability to regulate the private spaceflight industry, which has since been extended multiple times.
12 July 2006 – A Russian-Ukrainian Dnepr rocket launches Genesis I, an experimental inflatable space habitat developed and owned by Bigelow Aerospace that is the first inflatable habitat module to reach orbit.
28 September 2008 – SpaceX conducts the first successful launch of its Falcon 1 rocket, the first privately developed liquid fueled rocket to reach orbit.

2010s

8 December 2010 – SpaceX successfully launches and recovers its Dragon capsule on its first mission, marking the first time a privately developed and operated spacecraft is recovered from orbit.
25 May 2012 – The second mission of SpaceX's Dragon capsule completes a successful rendezvous and berthing with the International Space Station, making it the first private spacecraft to do so.
May–July 2014 – A private initiative known as the ISEE-3 Reboot Project successfully contacts and takes control of NASA's defunct ISEE-3 space probe with support from NASA and the Arecibo Observatory, making them the first private group to command a spacecraft in deep space, though their plans to change the probe's orbit are abandoned weeks later when its thrusters fail to respond properly.
23 October 2014 – LuxSpace, an aerospace contractor based in Luxembourg, launches the Manfred Memorial Moon Mission (4M), the first commercial payload sent to fly by the Moon, attached to the third stage of the rocket that lifted Chinese lunar flyby spacecraft Chang'e 5-T1.
23 November 2015 – Blue Origin successfully launches its New Shepard launch system into space and lands it vertically, making it the first VTVL rocket to land on Earth from space.
25 November 2015 – President Barack Obama signs the U.S. Commercial Space Launch Competitiveness Act, also known as the Spurring Private Aerospace Competitiveness and Entrepreneurship Act or SPACE Act of 2015, which codifies the ability of American companies to own material resources extracted in outer space.
21 December 2015 – SpaceX lands the first stage of its Falcon 9 rocket at Landing Zone 1 at Cape Canaveral, marking the first recovery of a VTVL stage from an orbital rocket.
22 January 2016– Blue Origin successfully launches and lands the same New Shepard booster flown in November, making it the first VTVL rocket to reach space twice.
30 March 2017– SpaceX successfully launches and lands the first stage of a Falcon 9 that had previously flown in April 2016, making it the first VTVL rocket to be used on two orbital flights.
13 July 2017– The Luxembourg Chamber of Deputies adopts a law guaranteeing companies the right to own resources extracted in space, making Luxembourg the first European nation to do so.
21 January 2018 – American aerospace company Rocket Lab successfully launched its Electron rocket from Mahia Launch Center on January 21, 2018 carrying three cubesats into low earth orbit. This was the first time that a rocket entered orbit after launching from a privately owned and operated spaceport.

2020s

30 May 2020– SpaceX successfully launches a Falcon 9 rocket carrying the Crew Demo space capsule during the Demo-2 mission, marking the first privately-developed crewed mission to orbit and to visit the ISS.
11 July 2021– Virgin Galactic successfully launches Richard Branson on a SpaceShipTwo to space, marking the first privately-developed crewed mission to space carrying a founder of a space company.
20 July 2021– Blue Origin successfully launches Jeff Bezos on a New Shepard rocket to space above the Karman Line, marking the first privately-developed crewed mission to space with a company founder to get above the Karman Line.
16 September 2021– SpaceX operates the Inspiration4 mission, the first orbital spaceflight with only private citizens aboard.
8 April 2022– Axiom Mission 1 by Axiom Space is the first wholly commercially-operated crewed mission to the International Space Station.
March 2023– Polaris Dawn is a planned mission that will mark the first commercial extravehicular activity as well as break the Gemini 11 record of highest orbit flown.
May 2023– MIT and Rocket Lab plan to launch the Venus Life Finder Mission, the first privately-funded interplanetary spaceflight.

See also
History of spaceflight
Commercialization of space

References

+
Spaceflight timelines